Friedrich of Brandenburg-Bayreuth(ca.1550 - ?) was a nobleman of Germany from the Hohenzollern dynasty. He was a reversioner of Margrave of Brandenburg-Kulmbach, a son of Albert Alcibiades, and the grandson of Casimir, Margrave of Brandenburg-Bayreuth.

Brandenberg was a child when his father Albert Alcibiades was defeated in a  Schmalkaldischer battle and excommunicated. Alcibiades then escaped to France. After he did not inherit his land, he went to his cousin George Friedrich. Alcibiades never returned to Brandenburg and he left no issue.

Ancestors

Notes

House of Hohenzollern
People from Ansbach
People from the Principality of Ansbach
Margraves of Bayreuth
Date of death unknown